Albert Séguin (8 March 1891 – 29 May 1948) was a French gymnast and Olympic champion. He competed at the 1924 Summer Olympics, where he received a gold medal in sidehorse vault, and silver medals in rope climbing and in team combined exercises.

References

External links
Albert Séguin's profile at Sports Reference.com

1891 births
1948 deaths
French male artistic gymnasts
Gymnasts at the 1924 Summer Olympics
Olympic gymnasts of France
Olympic gold medalists for France
Olympic silver medalists for France
Olympic medalists in gymnastics
Medalists at the 1924 Summer Olympics
20th-century French people